2009 FIFA Beach Soccer World Cup qualification (UEFA) was a tournament played in Castellón from June 7 to June 14 to determine five teams that qualified to the 2009 FIFA Beach Soccer World Cup in Dubai, United Arab Emirates.

Group stage

Group A

Group B

Group C

Group D

Group E

Group F

Group G

First knockout round

Quarter-finals

5th place play-off

5th place

Semi-finals

3rd place

Final

References

Results, at the Roonba
UA-Football reports: Day 1, Day 2, Day 3, Day 4, Day 5, Day 6, Day 7.

UEFA
Beach Soccer World Cup Qualification
2009
FIFA Beach Soccer World Cup qualification (UEFA)
2009 in beach soccer